Hotel Transylvania 2 is a 2015 American computer-animated monster comedy film directed by Genndy Tartakovsky, written by Robert Smigel and Adam Sandler, and it is the second installment in the Hotel Transylvania franchise and the sequel to Hotel Transylvania (2012). Produced by Sony Pictures Animation, it was animated by Sony Pictures Imageworks, with additional funding provided by LStar Capital.

Hotel Transylvania 2 takes place several years after the events of the first film. Mavis and Johnny have a young son named Dennis, whose lack of any vampire abilities worries both Mavis and his maternal grandfather Dracula for differing reasons. When Mavis and Johnny travel to Johnny's hometown in California, Drac calls his friends to help him make Dennis a vampire, much to Mavis's dismay.

Original voices from the first film — Sandler, Andy Samberg, Selena Gomez, Kevin James, David Spade, Steve Buscemi, Molly Shannon, Fran Drescher, Rob Riggle, Sadie Sandler, Jonny Solomon, Luenell, Chris Parnell and Jon Lovitz — returned for the sequel, with Keegan-Michael Key replacing CeeLo Green as Murray. New additions to the cast include Asher Blinkoff, Nick Offerman, Megan Mullally, Dana Carvey and Mel Brooks. The film was released on September 25, 2015, by Sony Pictures Releasing under the Columbia Pictures label. Unlike its predecessor, Hotel Transylvania 2 received mixed reviews from critics, though it was deemed inferior to the original film. Hotel Transylvania 2 grossed over $474 million worldwide on an $80 million budget. A sequel, Hotel Transylvania 3: Summer Vacation, was released in July 2018.

Plot
Some time after the events of the first film, Mavis and Johnny are finally married, with the approval of her father Count Dracula. A year after the wedding, Mavis reveals to Drac that she is pregnant and later gives birth to a baby boy whom the couple name Dennis, nicknamed “Denisovich” by Dracula.

As Dennis's fifth birthday nears, he has yet to grow his fangs and Drac worries that his grandson might not gain vampire powers. Noticing the potential dangers her son might face living in Transylvania, Mavis starts to consider moving to Johnny's hometown in California in order to give Dennis a more “normal” childhood, much to Drac's disapproval. Drac tells Johnny (who does not want to leave the hotel either) to bring Mavis to California to visit his parents, Mike and Linda, but to make sure to keep her distracted so that she will not move, leaving Dracula to "babysit" Dennis.

Convinced that Dennis is a "late fanger", Drac enlists his friends Frank, Wayne, Griffin, Murray, and Blobby to help train Dennis to become a monster, but every attempt that they try fails. Drac and the gang then go to Camp Winnepacaca, Drac's childhood summer camp, only to sneak away after Drac finds out that the camp has become much safer and child-friendly. Drac attempts to hurl Dennis from a tall, unstable tower to pressure the boy's transformation into a bat, but he fails to transform and Drac flies down and rescues him at the last second.

Meanwhile, in California, Mavis enjoys exploring the more human world. When the couple arrive at Mike and Linda's house, Linda unsuccessfully attempts to make Mavis feel more comfortable by covering her room with spooky, Halloween decorations and inviting other monster/human couples over. Feeling like a stranger, Mavis retreats up to the roof, and Johnny tells her that if they stay together, Dennis will live normally, persuading her to stay at the hotel. However, Johnny then discovers a video of Dennis falling that was filmed by the campers, and he and a furious Mavis go back to Transylvania, with Drac and his friends reaching the hotel at the same time. Mavis confronts her father for putting Dennis in grave danger and failing to accept him as a human, and shows him a pop music remix parody of Dennis in danger and Drac arguing with the staff. Mavis says that they will move out of the hotel after Dennis's birthday party.

The night before the party, Drac hosts Johnny's family, and finds out that Mavis invited his father Vlad. As Vlad is more hateful of humans than he was, Drac tells Johnny to have his family disguise themselves as monsters. The next day, Vlad arrives with his monstrous bat-like servant Bela, and meets Dennis for the first time. Believing that fear will cause Dennis' fangs to sprout, Vlad possesses a stage performer, named Brandon, dressed as Dennis' favorite TV monster Kakie to scare him, but Drac shields his frightened grandson at the last moment, breaking Vlad's hold over the performer. Mavis mistakenly believes that Drac was responsible for the ruse, and while the family argues about whether or not Dennis can be happy in California, a guilt-ridden Dennis flees the hotel and enters the forest with Wayne and Wanda's daughter Winnie, who has a crush on him, in tow.

Irritated with Vlad, Johnny and his family expose themselves, and an irate Vlad reprimands Drac for accepting humans. Upon hearing that Dennis is a human, Bela attacks him and Winnie in their treehouse and abducts them. When Bela injures Winnie and threatens to destroy the hotel, Dennis's anger causes him to instantly grow his fangs and develop his vampire abilities, and he bashes up Bela. A furious but defeated Bela calls his giant-bat minions, but Drac, Johnny, Mavis, Dennis, and the rest of the monsters team up to defeat Bela's minions and drive them away, while Bela is shrunk by Vlad, who has been won over by Drac's claim that humans now coexist peacefully. With Dennis finally embracing his vampire abilities, Johnny and Mavis decide to continue raising him in Transylvania, and they resume the party with his friends and family.

Voice cast

Production

Director Genndy Tartakovsky commented about the possibility of the sequel in October 2012, "Everyone is talking about it, but we haven't started writing it. There are a lot of fun ideas we could totally play with. It's a ripe world." The next month it was announced that a sequel had been greenlit, and was scheduled for release on September 25, 2015. On March 12, 2014, it was announced that Tartakovsky would return to direct the sequel, even though he was originally too busy due to his developing an adaptation of Popeye, which would later get shelved.

CeeLo Green did not reprise the role of Murray the Mummy for the sequel after he was charged for giving a woman ecstasy in July 2012 which led to Sony Pictures Animation parting ways with Green and replacing him with Keegan-Michael Key.

It was suggested by director Genndy Tartakovsky that Adam Sandler had more creative control over this film than its predecessor, and that at times he was difficult to work with.

Music
In March 2015, it was announced that Mark Mothersbaugh, who scored the first film, had signed on to score the sequel.

American girl group Fifth Harmony recorded a song for the film entitled "I'm in Love with a Monster". It was featured in the film's official trailer and was also played when the film itself was released.

Release

Theatrical
Columbia Pictures released the film in the United States on September 25, 2015 and in the United Kingdom on 16 October 2015.

Home media
Hotel Transylvania 2 was released on DVD and Blu-ray (2D and 3D) on January 12, 2016, by Sony Pictures Home Entertainment. The film was also released in Digital HD on December 22, 2015.

In April 2021, Sony signed a deal giving Disney access to their legacy content, including past Hotel Transylvania films to stream on Disney+ and Hulu and appear on Disney's linear television networks. Disney's access to Sony's titles would come following their availability on Netflix.

Reception

Box office
Hotel Transylvania 2 has grossed $169.7 million in North America and $303.5 million elsewhere, for a worldwide total of $473 million, against a budget of $80 million. Deadline Hollywood calculated the net profit of the film to be $159.48 million, when factoring together all expenses and revenues for the film. It was Sony Pictures Animation's highest-grossing film worldwide until its sequel, Hotel Transylvania 3: Summer Vacation, surpassed it in September 2018, with Spider-Man: Into the Spider-Verse also surpassing the film's domestic gross in January 2019.

Predictions for the opening of Hotel Transylvania 2 in North America were continuously revised upwards, starting from $35—$48 million. Hotel Transylvania 2 earned $13.3 million from 3,754 theaters on its opening day in North America, which was the second-biggest Friday opening day in September, behind Insidious: Chapter 2 ($20.3 million). During its opening weekend, Hotel Transylvania 2 earned $48.5 million from 3,754 theaters, which at the time set new records such as the highest opening for a Sony Pictures Animation film, the biggest opening in Adam Sandler's career, beating 2005's The Longest Yard ($47.6 million), and previously held the biggest opening in the month of September (record overtaken by It in 2017). Regarding the film's successful opening, Josh Greenstein, Sony's president of marketing said, "We had a great date, and this is a big win for Sony Pictures Animation." The largest demographic of the opening weekend audience was under the age of 25 (60%) and female (59%), followed by male (41%), 25 and over (40%) and kids (38%). According to Rentrak's PostTrak reports, 23% of the audience bought tickets because it was an animated film, while 16% were attracted to the toon's subject matter and plot.

Hotel Transylvania 2 was released in a total of 90 countries. It was released in 42 markets between September 25 and 27, 2015, the same weekend as its North American release, and earned $30.18 million from 6,500 screens that weekend. Its overall rank for the weekend was second, behind Everest. Its opening weekends in the U.K., Ireland and Malta ($9.5 million including previews), Mexico ($7.84 million), South Korea ($4.2 million), Russia and the CIS ($6 million), Germany ($3.9 million), Italy ($3.7 million) and France and Spain ($3.2 million respectively) in October represented its largest takings. In China, it opened with an estimated $12.1 million debuting at second place behind the Chinese local film The Witness which grossed $18.5 million. While the China figures are low in comparison to recent Hollywood movie openings, it actually excelled the first film's local lifetime gross by 19% in just the first six days. In terms of total earnings, its largest market outside of North America is the U.K. ($29.4 million) followed by Mexico ($23.7 million) and Venezuela ($19.9 million).

Critical reception
Its critical consensus reads, "Hotel Transylvania 2 is marginally better than the original, which may or may not be enough of a recommendation to watch 89 minutes of corny, colorfully animated gags from Adam Sandler and company." Metacritic (which uses a weighted average) assigned Hotel Transylvania 2 a score of 44 out of 100 based on 24 critics, indicating "mixed or average reviews". Audiences polled by CinemaScore gave the film an average grade of "A−" on an A+ to F scale.

Max Nicholson of IGN awarded it a score of 6.5 out of 10, saying "While Genndy Tartakovsky's animation is top-notch, Hotel Transylvania 2 doesn't live up to the first monster mash." Nick Schager of Variety gave the film a negative review, saying "Its plot comes across as just a rickety skeleton designed to prop up Sandler and company's litany of cornball punchlines and gags, only a few of which cleverly play-off of these characters' iconography" Alonso Duralde of The Wrap gave the film a positive review, saying "Whereas the jokes in the Grown Ups series feel reactionary and bullying, the family-friendly Hotel Transylvania gags instead come off as clever and humane, even when they're making fun of helicopter moms and lawsuit-sensitive summer camps." Stephen Whitty of the Newark Star-Ledger gave the film one and a half stars out of four, saying "Great movies like ParaNorman and Frankenweenie showed the laughs you could get out of funny fiends; Hotel Transylvania 2 just digs up a few corny gags." Bruce Demara of the Toronto Star gave the film two and a half stars out of four, saying "While the first Hotel Trans had humour for both younger and older audiences, this one will likely fall short in its appeal to adults, although there's plenty for the little monsters to enjoy."

Peter Hartlaub of the San Francisco Chronicle gave the film one out of four stars, saying "Hotel Transylvania 2 is an unfortunate throwback to about 20 years ago, when animated movies were more widely accepted as cinematic babysitters." Sandie Angulo Chen of The Washington Post gave the film two out of four stars, saying "Tartakovsky hasn't created the sort of sequel that eclipses the original, but then again the original wasn't exactly Toy Story or How to Train Your Dragon." Jesse Hassenger of The A.V. Club gave the film a C+, saying "It's an episodic, energetically animated gag factory from the pen of Adam Sandler, and while it's the best screenplay to bear his name in years, it also warps some overfamiliar family-movie concerns until they become unavoidable in their ickiness." Michael Rechtshaffen of The Hollywood Reporter gave the film a positive review, saying "This time around, greater attention has been paid to story and character development (while scaling back on all the sight gags) and the substantial results give the ample voice cast and returning director Genndy Tartakovsky more to sink their teeth into, with pleasing results." Josh Kupecki of The Austin Chronicle gave the film one out of five stars, saying "Channeling your inner child, you may find solace in Hotel Transylvania 2, but in the end it has no bite, doing continued disservice to the Universal monsters it scabs out, and adding another soiled feather to Sandler's cap of mediocrity."

Accolades

Sequel

Michelle Murdocca, the film's producer, said before the film's release that the studio was "talking about number 3 and moving forward and taking the franchise to the next level." On November 2, 2015, it was announced Hotel Transylvania 3 would be released on September 21, 2018. Despite previously leaving the series to direct other projects, Genndy Tartakovsky would return as director for this installment. According to Tartakovsky, he returned after he got an inspiration from a "miserable" family vacation. Adam Sandler, Selena Gomez, and Andy Samberg also reprised their previous roles as Drac, Mavis and Johnny in the film, which was written by Austin Powers writer Michael McCullers. The film took place aboard a cruise ship. On February 6, 2017, the release date was moved up to July 13, 2018. It has been released and Hotel Transylvania 4 has also been released.

References

External links

 
 

2015 3D films
2015 computer-animated films
2010s American animated films
2010s children's comedy films
American 3D films
American children's animated comedy films
American comedy horror films
American computer-animated films
American monster movies
American sequel films
Columbia Pictures films
Columbia Pictures animated films
Films about father–daughter relationships
Dracula films
Films scored by Mark Mothersbaugh
Animated films about families
Films about shapeshifting
Films about vacationing
Films directed by Genndy Tartakovsky
Films produced by Michelle Murdocca
Films set in Santa Cruz County, California
Films set in hotels
Films set in Transylvania
Films set in Romania
Hotel Transylvania
2010s monster movies
Mummy films
Bigfoot films
Films with screenplays by Adam Sandler
Films with screenplays by Robert Smigel
Sony Pictures Animation films
Werewolves in animated film
Crossover films
3D animated films
Films set in Europe
2015 comedy films
2010s English-language films